Anthrenus lepidus is a species of carpet beetle in the family Dermestidae. It is found in North America.

Subspecies
These four subspecies belong to the species Anthrenus lepidus:
 Anthrenus lepidus conspersus Casey
 Anthrenus lepidus lepidus
 Anthrenus lepidus obtectus Casey
 Anthrenus lepidus suffusus Casey

References

Further reading

 
 

Anthrenus
Articles created by Qbugbot
Beetles described in 1854